The Red Book of Hergest, Oxford, Jesus College, MS 111, is a large vellum manuscript written shortly after 1382, which ranks as one of the most important medieval manuscripts written in the Welsh language. It preserves a collection of Welsh prose and poetry, notably the tales of the Mabinogion and Gogynfeirdd poetry. The manuscript derives its name from the colour of its leather binding and from its association with Hergest Court between the late 15th and early 17th century.

Compilation 
The manuscript was written between about 1382 and 1410. One of the several copyists responsible for the manuscript has been identified as Hywel Fychan fab Hywel Goch of Buellt. He is known to have worked for Hopcyn ap Tomas ab Einion ( 1330–1403) of Ynysforgan, Swansea, and it is possible that the manuscript was compiled for Hopcyn.

According to scholar Daniel Huws, it is "by far the heaviest of the medieval books in Welsh, the largest in its dimensions...and the thickest".

History 
The manuscript appears to have been retained by Hopcyn's family until the end of the 15th century, when Hopcyn's grandson Hopcyn ap Rhys was held complicit in the rebellion against King Edward IV and consequently saw much of his property forfeited. The Vaughans of Tretower, then in Breconshire, obtained it, probably in 1465 on receiving Hopcyn's forfeited possessions. Ownership is suggested by two odes (awdlau) dedicated to Sir Thomas Vaughan ( 1483) and his sons, which were written into the manuscript by Welsh poet Lewys Glyn Cothi at Tretower. The Red Book soon passed into the possession of the Vaughans of Hergest Court, near Kington in the Welsh Marches. Sir John Price of Brecon reports to have seen the manuscript in 1550, presumably at Hergest. In the late 1560s, William Salesbury found the manuscript in the possession of Sir Henry Sidney at Ludlow, when Siancyn Gwyn of Llanidloes held it on loan from him.

By the early 17th century, the Red Book had passed to the Mansels of Margam, hence back in Glamorgan. It was possibly brought into the marriage between Henry's granddaughter Catherine Sidney and Sir Lewis Mansel, who is reported to have owned it in 1634. The manuscript was later found in the collection of Thomas Wilkins (d. 1699), a Welsh clergyman and antiquarian, who may have borrowed it from the Mansels without ever returning it. In 1697, Wilkins was visited by Edward Lhuyd who spent some time copying a manuscript which might well have been the Red Book.

In 1701, two years after Wilkin's death, his son Thomas Wilkins the Younger donated the manuscript to Jesus College, Oxford. Internal evidence, a note by the latter Wilkins, suggests that Edward Lhuyd then held the manuscript on loan, but that the college was able to retrieve it only 13 years later, after Lhuyd's death. The book was given on 17 February 1701 to Jesus College by Reverend Thomas Wilkins the younger of Llanblethian. The college keeps the manuscript on deposit at the Bodleian Library.

Content 

The first part of the manuscript contains prose, including the Mabinogion, for which this is one of the manuscript sources, other tales, historical texts (including a Welsh translation of Geoffrey of Monmouth's ), and various other texts including a series of Triads. It contains also poems by Myrddin Wyllt. The Red Book is similar in content to the White book of Rhydderch, of which it has at times been supposed to be a copy. Both are now thought, however, to descend from a lost common ancestor or ancestors.

The manuscript also contains a collection of herbal remedies associated with Rhiwallon Feddyg, founder of a medical dynasty that lasted over 500 years – 'The Physicians of Myddfai' from the village of Myddfai just outside Llandovery.

Influence 
Some researchers believe that J. R. R. Tolkien borrowed the title for the Red Book of Westmarch, the imagined legendary source of Tolkien's tales.

Proposed return to Wales 

The Red Book of Hergest has been cited as one of the important Welsh artefacts for return to Wales, from England.

See also 
 White Book of Hergest
 White Book of Rhydderch

References

Sources 
 'Red book of Hergest'. In Meic Stephens (Ed.) (1998), The new companion to the literature of Wales. Cardiff : University of Wales Press. .
 
 Thomas, Richard Biography of Thomas Wilkins, Welsh Biography Online (National Library of Wales)

Further reading

External links 

 Red Book of Hergest, or Jesus College MS. 111. Full colour images available on Digital Bodleian.
 Catalogue record for Jesus College MS. 111
Mary Jones, Celtic Encyclopedia: Llyfr Coch Hergest (entry on manuscript)
Mary Jones, Celtic Literature Collective: Llyfr Coch Hergest (contents & translations)
British Medical Association – Wales & Medicine

14th-century books
Welsh manuscripts
Mabinogion
Medieval Welsh literature
Welsh-language literature
Welsh mythology
Jesus College, Oxford
Bodleian Library collection